Tetrachlorvinphos is an organophosphate insecticide used to kill fleas and ticks.

History
Tetrachlorvinphos was initially registered for use in the United States in 1966 by the U.S. Department of Agriculture. Tetrachlorvinphos was originally registered for use on various food crops, livestock, pet animals, and in or around buildings. The crop uses were voluntarily canceled from product registrations in 1987.  In 2014, the Natural Resources Defense Council (NRDC) filed a lawsuit against the United States Environmental Protection Agency (EPA) seeking EPA to respond to NRDC's 2009 petition to ban tetrachlorvinphos in common pet flea treatment products.

Human health hazards
Symptoms of exposure to this material include increased perspiration, nausea, lachrymation, salivation, blurred vision, diarrhea, pulmonary edema, respiratory embarrassment and convulsions. The chemical material may be absorbed through the skin and is a lachrymator. It is a cholinesterase inhibitor and is a positive animal carcinogen.

Chemical properties
The substance is insoluble in water. Flash point data are not available for this chemical; however, it is probably combustible. Tetrachlorvinphos is slowly hydrolyzed in neutral and aqueous acidic media. Is rapidly hydrolyzed in alkaline media.

Alternative Chemical Names
This is a listing of alternate names for this chemical, including trade names and synonyms.

 BENZYL ALCOHOL, 2,4,5-TRICHLORO-ALPHA-(CHLOROMETHYLENE)-, DIMETHYL PHOSPHATE
 2-CHLORO-1-(2,4,5-TRICHLOROPHENYL)VINYL DIMETHYL PHOSPHATE
 2-CHLORO-1-(2,4,5-TRICHLOROPHENYL)VINYL PHOSPHORIC ACID DIMETHYL ESTER
 DIMETHYL 2,4,5-TRICHLORO-ALPHA-(CHLOROMETHYLENE)BENZYL PHOSPHATE
 GARDONA
 IPO 8
 NCI C00168
 PHOSPHORIC ACID, 2-CHLORO-1-(2,3,5-TRICHLOROPHENYL) ETHENYL DIMETHYL ESTER
 PHOSPHORIC ACID, 2-CHLORO-1-(2,4,5-TRICHLOROPHENYL)VINYL DIMETHYL ESTER
 RABON
 RABOND
 TETRACHLORVINPHOS
 2,4,5-TRICHLORO-ALPHA-(CHLOROMETHYLENE)BENZYL ALCOHOL DIMETHYL PHOSPHATE
 2,4,5-TRICHLORO-ALPHA-(CHLOROMETHYLENE)BENZYL PHOSPHATE

References

This article contains public domain text from the EPA and the NOAA .

External links
 Tetrachlorvinphos (TCVP), Environmental Protection Agency

Acetylcholinesterase inhibitors
Organophosphate insecticides
Chloroarenes
IARC Group 2B carcinogens
Methoxy compounds